General Croft may refer to:

Andrew A. Croft (born 1965), U.S. Air Force lieutenant general
John R. Croft (fl. 1970s–2000s), U.S. Air National Guard brigadier general
William Denman Croft (1879–1968), British Army brigadier general

See also
James Crofts (British Army officer) (c. 1683–1732), British Army major general